S. communis may refer to:
 Sepsis communis, a synonym for Sepsis fulgens, the lesser dung fly, a small ant-mimicking fly species
 Sylvia communis, the whitethroat, a common and widespread typical warbler species

See also
 Communis (disambiguation)